The 2012–13 Radivoj Korać Cup season is the eleventh season of the Serbian national basketball cup tournament.

The competition starts on February 7 and will conclude with the Final on February 10, 2013.

Teams

Eight teams competed in this years cup.

Bracket

Quarterfinals

Semifinals

Final

References

External links
 Basketball Federation of Serbia 

Radivoj Korać Cup
Radivoj
Serbia